Beni Rabiâa is a village located in Msaken region, Sousse governorate, Tunisia at a distance of 6 km to the south west of Msaken.

Populated places in Tunisia
Villages in Tunisia
Sousse Governorate